Freedom (12 meter US-30) is a 12-metre class racing yacht and winner of the 1980 America's Cup, defeating the challenging yacht Australia under skipper Dennis Conner. Freedom was designed with an alloy rather than a wood hull by Olin Stephens and Bill Langan, and constructed at Minneford Yacht Yard. She was skippered in the Cup by Dennis Conner.

Today Freedom is available for charter out of Newport, Rhode Island from America's Cup Charters, along with fellow America's Cup winners Intrepid and Weatherly.

References

America's Cup defenders
Individual sailing vessels
12-metre class yachts
Yachts of New York Yacht Club members
Sailboat type designs by Olin Stephens
Sailboat type designs by Sparkman and Stephens
1980s sailing yachts
Sailing yachts built in the United States
1980 America's Cup